Comic Idol is a competition held in The Beano every few years. In it, 3 to 6 new strips (or old strips brought back), run as guest strips in Beano for a few weeks, and the most popular, determined by votes, gets a permanent place in the Beano (although often not lasting forever). See below for a full list of winners and the losing strips.                                            
Winners                                                                                           
1995: Vic Volcano (Robert Nixon/Trevor Metcalfe)                                                                                          
1997: Tim Traveller (Vic Neill)/Crazy for Daisy (Nick Brennan)                                                                                           
1999: The Three Bears (Mike Pearse)                                                                                            
2002: Freddie Fear (Dave Eastbury)                                                                                          
2004: Joe Jitsu (Wayne Thompson) /Colin the Vet (Duncan Scott)                                                                                          
2005: Zap Zodiac (Steve Horrocks)                                                                                          
2006: Nicky Nutjob (Kelly Dyson)                                                                                           
2010: Meebo and Zuky (Laura Howell)                                                                                                                                      
Loser
1995: S.O.S Squad (Robert Nixon) /Minder Bird (Terry Willers)                            
1997: Camp Cosmos (John Geering)/S.Y.D.D/Trash Can Alley/Have-a-go-Jo (John Geering, David Mostyn and Bob Dewar)                                                                                            
1999: Tricky Dicky (John Dallas)/Gordon Bennett (Jimmy Hansen)/Inspector Horse and Jocky (Terry Bave)                                                             
2002: Space Kidette (Robert Nixon)/Phone-a-Fiend (Wayne Thompson)                       
2004: Dean's Dino (Geoff Waterhouse)                                                         
2005: Hugh Dunnit (David Mostyn)/Christmas Carole (Keith Page)                         
2006: Scammin' Sam (Steve Horrocks)/Mia Starr (Duncan Scott)                            
2010: Home Invasion (David Sutherland)/Uh, Oh, Si Co! (Nigel Parkinson)                  
                                                                                          The Beano